The Parliament of Boroa was a diplomatic meeting held on January 24, 1651, between various Mapuche groups and Spanish authorities held in the fields of Boroa. The parliament was attended by the Governor of Chile Antonio Acuña Cabrera who travelled to Boroa incognito from the fortress of Nacimiento in the north accompanied only by six men. This riskful crossing of Mapuche territory was considered valiant but reckless stunt by Spanish subordinates.

The terms of the treaty were detrimental to the Mapuche, almost everything agreed then was in favour of the Spanish, including a prohibition for the Mapuche to wear weapons unless the Spanish ask them to do so. Mapuches were also to help the Spanish build forts and allow them free passage through their lands. In hindsight the parliament is considered a failure given the massive Mapuche uprising that broke out four years later in 1655.

References

Boroa 1651
1651 in the Captaincy General of Chile
1651 treaties
History of Araucanía Region

es:Parlamento de Boroa